Nightmares (also known as Stage Fright) is a 1980 Australian slasher film, directed by John D. Lamond and was Gary Sweet's feature film debut.

Plot
A young girl named Cathy (Jenny Neumann) tries to keep her mother from making out with a man while driving one day, and she inadvertently causes her mother's death in the ensuing crash. Sixteen years later, Cathy is now named Helen and has become a psychotic actress and is starring in an upcoming play called Comedy of Blood, where the actors are picked off one by one by an unseen assailant with a shard of glass.

Cast
Jenny Neumann as Cathy/Helen Selleck
Jennie Lamond as Young Cathy
Gary Sweet as Terry Besanko
Max Phipps as George D'alberg
John Michael Howson as Bennett Collingwood
Nina Landis as Judy
Edmund Pegge as Bruce
Briony Behets as Angela

Production
The film was shot by Lamond immediately after Pacific Banana and edited at the same time. Lamond:
Nightmares should have been a lot better. We used the Steadicam camera for the first time in Australia on that. It was all right, but it didn't have any story. The technique was all right. Brian May's music was great. It was dumped by the distributor. No-one tried, nobody did anything. But it should have been better. Because it was a real quickie. I had the chance to make a real quickie, they said if you don't take the money we'll give it to somebody else. That was back in the old tax regime. You had to get the money, make the film, be finished by a certain time, you couldn't take longer.
Lamond says it was John Michael Howson's idea to set the movie in a theatre.

The film features a bitchy theatre critic called Bennett Collingswood (played by John Michael Howson) who many observers felt was a veiled attack on Colin Bennett, film critic of The Age who was often critical of Australian films.

It was the first professional job for Gary Sweet who later called the film "terrible, diabolical" but says it got him thinking "acting was, you know, all right."

References

External links

Nightmares at AustLit
Nightmares at Ozmovies

1980 horror films
1980s slasher films
1980 films
Australian slasher films
Films scored by Brian May (composer)
1980s English-language films